Imslandsjøen or Imsland is a village in Vindafjord municipality in Rogaland county, Norway. Imsland Church is located in the village.

The village was the administrative centre of the municipality of Imsland which existed from 1923 until 1965 when the municipality was dissolved.  Historically, Imslandsjøen had a post office and a steamship stop.  Today ships no longer call at the village, and the post office is located in nearby Vikedal.

References

Villages in Rogaland
Vindafjord